North Hesse describes the northern part and historical heart of the German federated state of Hesse. The region is – unlike the name Lower Hesse – not a historical territory and also has no established, standard and official administrative function. However, the name is common and widely used today, not least to contrast it with its counterpart, South Hesse. Over one million people live in North Hesse and its largest city is the former capital of the Electorate of Hesse, Kassel.

References

External links 
 www.nordhessen.de – Tourist portal of the region
 www.regionnordhessen.de – Economic portal of the region
 www.die-lage-ist-gut.de – The location portal of the region, focussed on employment and life
 Regional plan for North Hesse from the Hessian state planning portal